Ronald Jay Werner-Wilson (born 1962), Chair of the Family Studies Department and Kathryn Louise Chellgren Endowed Professor for Research in Family Studies at the University of Kentucky, is a scholar who has held faculty appointments since 1993.  His has published one book, book chapters, and numerous peer-reviewed journal articles.  He has investigated family and relationship influences on adolescent and young adult sexuality, positive youth development, therapy with adolescents, gender and power influences on therapeutic process, and physiological influences on family interaction.

Education
Werner-Wilson earned his Ph.D. in Marriage and Family Therapy from the Department of Child and Family Development at The University of Georgia in 1993.  His dissertation, directed by Sharon Price, was entitled The Differential Treatment of Men and Women in Marriage and Family Therapy.

He earned an M.A. in Sociology in 1990 from the Department of Sociology at Georgia State University.  His thesis project, directed by Paula Dressel, was entitled Are the Times A'Changin'?  A Content Analysis of Rolling Stone Magazine, 1968 and 1988.

He earned a B.S. degree in 1988 from the Department of Psychology at Georgia State University.

Professional experience
Werner-Wilson is Chair of the Family Studies Department and Kathryn Louise Chellgren Endowed Professor for Research in Family Studies at the University of Kentucky.  He joined the faculty in August 2007.

Prior to joining the University of Kentucky faculty, Werner-Wilson was an Assistant Professor (1998–2003), Associate Professor (2003–2007), and Director of the Marriage and Family Therapy Program (1999–2007) and Clinic (2000–2007) in the Department of Human Development and Family Studies at Iowa State University.

Assistant Professor and Director of the Marriage and Family Therapy Clinic in the Department of Human Development and Family Studies at Colorado State University from 1995 to 1998.

Assistant Professor in the Department of Family and Consumer Sciences at Western Michigan University from 1993 to 1995.

Personal life

Publications

Published books and book chapters
 Werner-Wilson, R. J. (2001). Developmental-Systemic Family Therapy with Adolescents.  Binghamton, NY: Haworth Press.  .

Published journal articles

References

External links
 Bluegrass Healthy Marriage Initiative
 Expertise profile, Community of Science
 University of Kentucky Family Studies Department
 Werner-Wilson's University of Kentucky web page

Living people
1962 births
University of Kentucky faculty